Rudolf Julius Emanuel Clausius (2 January 1822 – 24 August 1888) was a German physicist and mathematician and is considered one of the central founding fathers of the science of thermodynamics. By his restatement of Sadi Carnot's principle known as the Carnot cycle, he gave the theory of heat a truer and sounder basis. His most important paper, "On the Moving Force of Heat", published in 1850, first stated the basic ideas of the second law of thermodynamics. In 1865 he introduced the concept of entropy. In 1870 he introduced the virial theorem, which applied to heat.

Life
Clausius was born in Köslin (now Koszalin, Poland) in the Province of Pomerania in Prussia. His father was a Protestant pastor and school inspector, and Rudolf studied in the school of his father. In 1838, he went to the Gymnasium in Stettin. Clausius graduated from the University of Berlin in 1844 where he had studied mathematics and physics since 1840 with, among others, Gustav Magnus, Peter Gustav Lejeune Dirichlet and Jakob Steiner. He also studied history with Leopold von Ranke. During 1848, he got his doctorate from the University of Halle on optical effects in Earth's atmosphere. In 1850 he became professor of physics at the Royal Artillery and Engineering School in Berlin and Privatdozent at the Berlin University. In 1855 he became professor at the ETH Zürich, the Swiss Federal Institute of Technology in Zürich, where he stayed until 1867. During that year, he moved to Würzburg and two years later, in 1869 to Bonn.

In 1870 Clausius organized an ambulance corps in the Franco-Prussian War. He was wounded in battle, leaving him with a lasting disability. He was awarded the Iron Cross for his services.

His wife, Adelheid Rimpau died in 1875, leaving him to raise their six children. In 1886, he married Sophie Sack, and then had another child. Two years later, on 24 August 1888, he died in Bonn, Germany.

Work
Clausius's PhD thesis concerning the refraction of light proposed that we see a blue sky during the day, and various shades of red at sunrise and sunset (among other phenomena) due to reflection and refraction of light. Later, Lord Rayleigh would show that it was in fact due to the scattering of light, but regardless, Clausius used a far more mathematical approach than some have used.

His most famous paper, Ueber die bewegende Kraft der Wärme ("On the Moving Force of Heat and the Laws of Heat which may be Deduced Therefrom")
was published in 1850, and dealt with the mechanical theory of heat. In this paper, he showed there was a contradiction between Carnot's principle and the concept of conservation of energy. Clausius restated the two laws of thermodynamics to overcome this contradiction. This paper made him famous among scientists. (The third law was developed by Walther Nernst, during the years 1906–1912).

Clausius's most famous statement of the second law of thermodynamics was published in German in 1854, and in English in 1856. 

During 1857, Clausius contributed to the field of kinetic theory after refining August Krönig's very simple gas-kinetic model to include translational, rotational and vibrational molecular motions. In this same work he introduced the concept of 'Mean free path' of a particle.

Clausius deduced the Clausius–Clapeyron relation from thermodynamics. This relation, which is a way of characterizing the phase transition between two states of matter such as solid and liquid, had originally been developed in 1834 by Émile Clapeyron.

Entropy

In 1865, Clausius gave the first mathematical version of the concept of entropy, and also gave it its name.  Clausius chose the word because the meaning (from Greek ἐν en "in" and τροπή tropē "transformation") is "content transformative" or "transformation content" ("Verwandlungsinhalt"). He used the now abandoned unit 'Clausius' (symbol: Cl) for entropy.
1 Clausius (Cl) = 1 calorie/degree Celsius (cal/°C) = 4.1868 joules per kelvin (J/K)

The landmark 1865 paper in which he introduced the concept of entropy ends with the following summary of the first and second laws of thermodynamics:

Clausius explained his choice of "entropy" as a name as follows:
I prefer going to the ancient languages for the names of important scientific quantities, so that they may mean the same thing in all living tongues. I propose, therefore, to call S the entropy of a body, after the Greek word "transformation". I have designedly coined the word entropy to be similar to energy, for these two quantities are so analogous in their physical significance, that an analogy of denominations seems to me helpful.
Leon Cooper added that in this way he succeeded in coining a word that meant the same thing to everybody: nothing.

Tributes

 Honorary Membership of the Institution of Engineers and Shipbuilders in Scotland in 1859.IESIS Institution of Engineers and Shipbuilders in Scotland
 Iron Cross of 1870
 Fellow of the Royal Society of London in 1868 and received its Copley Medal in 1879.
 Member of the Royal Swedish Academy of Sciences in 1878.
 Huygens Medal in 1870.
 Foreign Member of the Accademia Nazionale dei Lincei in Rome in 1880
 Member of the German Academy of Sciences Leopoldina in 1880
 Poncelet Prize in 1883.
 Honorary doctorate from the University of Würzburg in 1882.
 Foreign Member of the Royal Netherlands Academy of Arts and Sciences in 1886.
 Pour le Mérite for Arts and Sciences in 1888
 The lunar crater Clausius named in his honor.
 A memorial in his home town of Koszalin in 2009

Publications
  English translations of nine papers.

See also
Hans Peter Jørgen Julius Thomsen, one of the founders of the thermochemistry.

References

External links

 Revival of Kinetic Theory by Clausius
 

 
 

1822 births
1888 deaths
People from Koszalin
Academic staff of ETH Zurich
Thermodynamicists
German military personnel of the Franco-Prussian War
19th-century German physicists
Fluid dynamicists
People from the Province of Pomerania
Recipients of the Iron Cross (1870)
Recipients of the Copley Medal
Recipients of the Pour le Mérite (civil class)
Humboldt University of Berlin alumni
Academic staff of the University of Bonn
Academic staff of the University of Würzburg
Foreign Members of the Royal Society
Foreign associates of the National Academy of Sciences
Members of the Royal Netherlands Academy of Arts and Sciences
Members of the Royal Swedish Academy of Sciences
Theoretical physicists
Prussian Army personnel